USS Pequot may refer to the following ships of the United States Navy:

 , a screw gunboat that served in the American Civil War between 1864–1865.
 , the former German cargo ship Ockenfels, seized 1917, and served 1918–1919.

United States Navy ship names